Lyshornet is a mountain in Bjørnafjorden Municipality in Vestland county, Norway. The Lyse Abbey lies at the southern base of the mountain.

See also
List of mountains of Norway

References

Bjørnafjorden
Mountains of Vestland